Rustler's Paradise is a 1935 American western film directed by Harry L. Fraser and starring Harry Carey, Gertrude Messinger and Edmund Cobb. It was produced by the Poverty Row studio Ajax Pictures for release as a second feature. It was later reissued by Astor Pictures in 1947.

Synopsis
Veteran rustler Cheyenne Kincaid discovers that the gang he is now riding with are led by the man responsible for killing his wife and kidnapping his daughter years before. He bonds with Connie, a young woman he discovers is his daughter, and helps a local landowner to fight off the gang.

Cast
 Harry Carey as Cheyenne Kincaid
 Gertrude Messinger as Connie
 Edmund Cobb as Larry Martin
 Carmen Bailey as Dolores Romero
 Theodore Lorch as 	El Diablo
 Roger Williams as Henchman Todd
 Chuck Morrison as 	Henchman
 Allen Greer as Henchman Antonio
 Chief Thundercloud as Henchman 
 Slim Whitaker as Senor Romero 
 Jimmy Aubrey as Henchman 
 Barney Beasley as 	Henchman 
 Tex Palmer as 	Henchman

References

Bibliography
 Pitts, Michael R. Poverty Row Studios, 1929–1940. McFarland & Company, 2005.

External links
 

1935 films
1935 Western (genre) films
American Western (genre) films
Films directed by Harry L. Fraser
American black-and-white films
1930s English-language films
1930s American films